Clunes railway station was a railway station on the Inverness and Ross-shire Railway, on the Inverness to Dingwall section. It was situated to the north of the village of Kirkhill.

The line became part of the Highland Railway on 1 February 1865, then, at grouping in 1923, it became part of the London Midland and Scottish Railway.

A passing loop was opened at Clunes in 1904. In 1914, this became the end of a 6 mile long double track section from Clachnaharry. This section reverted to single track in 1966.

References 

Ordnance Survey, 1:25,000 map NH54, 1961

Railway stations in Great Britain opened in 1864
Railway stations in Great Britain closed in 1960
Former Highland Railway stations
Disused railway stations in Highland (council area)